Agyneta mesasiatica is a species of sheet weaver found in Central Asia, Iran and Russia. It was described by Tanasevitch in 2000.

References

mesasiatica
Spiders described in 2000
Spiders of Asia
Spiders of Russia